St Andrew most commonly refers to Andrew the Apostle, the Christian apostle and brother of Peter.

St Andrew or St Andrews may also refer to:

People
 List of saints named Andrew, several people known as Saint Andrew

Places

Asia
St. Andrew's Hospital, Beijing
St. Andrews, Kerala, India

Europe
 Saint Andrew, Guernsey, a parish in the Channel Islands
 St. Andrew's, Malta, an informal district in Pembroke, Malta
 Basilica di Sant'Andrea (Basilica and monastery of St. Andrew), Vercelli, Italy

United Kingdom

Scotland
 St Andrews, a town and former royal burgh on the east coast of Fife, Scotland, United Kingdom.
 University of St Andrews, the oldest university in Scotland, and the third-oldest university in the English-speaking world.
 St Andrews Links, 7 golf courses in St Andrews in Scotland, including the Old Course
 Old Course at St Andrews, golf course where golf has been played since the 15th century
 The Royal and Ancient Golf Club of St Andrews, one of the oldest and most prestigious golf clubs in the world, based in St Andrews in Scotland.
 St Andrews Castle, a ruin located in the coastal Royal Burgh of St Andrews in Fife, Scotland
 St Andrews Burghs (UK Parliament constituency), it was a district of burghs constituency, representing various burghs of Fife, Scotland, in the House of Commons of the Parliament of the United Kingdom, from 1832 to 1918.
 St. Andrew's First Aid, a first aid charity based in Scotland
 St Andrew's House, Edinburgh, headquarters of the Scottish Executive
 St Andrews, Orkney, a parish on the island of Orkney

England
 St Andrews, Bristol, a suburb of Bristol, England
 St Andrew's (stadium), the home stadium of Association football team Birmingham City F.C.
 St Andrew's Hospital, Northampton, providing psychiatric services
 St Andrew's Hospital, Bow, London, England
 St Andrew's Hospital, Dollis Hill, London, England
 St Andrews, Swindon, a civil parish of the Borough of Swindon
 "Earl of St Andrews", a subsidiary title belonging to the Duke of Kent

Wales
 St Andrew, Llandaff, a private residence in Cardiff 
 St. Andrews Major, a village parish in the Vale of Glamorgan

Northern Ireland
 St. Andrews (alias Ballyhalbert), a civil parish in County Down, Northern Ireland

North America

Canada
 St. Andrews Heights, Calgary, a neighbourhood in Calgary, Alberta
 Rural Municipality of St. Andrews No. 287, Saskatchewan
 Rural Municipality of St. Andrews, Manitoba
St. Andrews (electoral district), Manitoba
 St. Andrews West, a community in South Stormont, Ontario
 St. Andrew station, a subway station in Toronto, Ontario
 St. Andrew (provincial electoral district), Ontario
 St. Andrews, New Brunswick
 St. Andrews, Nova Scotia

United States
 Fort St. Andrews
 Andrew station, Boston
 Saint Andrew, New York
 St. Andrews, South Carolina
 Saint Andrews, Washington
 St. Andrews Bay (Florida)

Oceania

Australia
 St Andrews, New South Wales, a suburb of Sydney
 St Andrews, Victoria, a suburb of Melbourne

New Zealand
 Saint Andrews, Canterbury, a rural community in Waimate District
 St Andrews, Waikato, a suburb of Hamilton

Caribbean 
 Saint Andrew, Barbados, parish
 Saint Andrew County, Trinidad and Tobago
 Saint Andrew Parish (disambiguation), the name of parishes in several Caribbean nations

Educational establishments

 St Andrew's Greek Orthodox Theological College,  Sydney, New South Wales, Australia
 St Andrew's School (Adelaide), South Australia, Australia
 St. Andrew's College, Aurora, Ontario, Canada
 St Andrew's University (Momoyama Gakuin University), Osaka, Japan
 St. Andrew's College, Grahamstown, South Africa
 St. Andrew's School for Girls, Johannesburg, South Africa
 St Andrews International School Bangkok, Thailand
 University of St Andrews, St Andrews, Scotland, United Kingdom
Saint Andrew's School (Boca Raton), Boca Raton, Florida, United States
 New Saint Andrews College, Moscow, Idaho, United States
 St. Andrews University, Laurinburg, North Carolina, United States

Ships
Saint Andrew (battleship), an imperial Russian battleship
Saint Andrew (ship), a Russian fisheries research vessel
, the name of three different Royal Navy ships

Media
St Andrew (Zurbarán), a 1635-1640 painting of the apostle, by Francisco de Zurbarán
"St. Andrew (This Battle Is in the Air)", a song by the White Stripes from Icky Thump, 2007
"St. Andrews", a song by Bedouin Soundclash from Street Gospels, 2007

See also 
 St. Andrew's Church (disambiguation)
 St. Andrew's Cathedral (disambiguation)
 Saint Andrews F.C. (disambiguation), several football clubs
 St. Andrew's Parish (disambiguation)
 St. Andrew's School (disambiguation)
 San Andrés (disambiguation)
 San Andreas (disambiguation)
 Sveti Andrija (disambiguation)